Raymundo de Jesús Fulgencio Román (born 12 February 2000) is a Mexican professional footballer who plays as a winger for Liga MX club Tigres UANL.

Career statistics

Club

Honours
Tigres UANL
CONCACAF Champions League: 2020

References

External links
Raymundo Fulgencio at Soccerway 
Raymundo Fulgencio at Official Liga MX profile

2000 births
Living people
Mexican footballers
Association football midfielders
Tigres UANL footballers
Liga MX players
C.D. Veracruz footballers
People from Veracruz (city)
Footballers from Veracruz